Telgate is a comune (municipality) in the Province of Bergamo in the Italian region of Lombardy, located about  northeast of Milan and about  southeast of Bergamo.

Telgate borders the following municipalities: Bolgare, Chiuduno, Grumello del Monte, Palazzolo sull'Oglio, Palosco.

The main church is San Giovanni Battista.

Twin towns — sister cities
Telgate is twinned with:

  Šmartno pri Litiji, Slovenia

References

External links
 Official website